Étienne Jourdain (12 April 1897 – 22 May 1964) was a French wrestler. He competed in the freestyle lightweight event at the 1924 Summer Olympics.

References

External links
 

1897 births
1964 deaths
Olympic wrestlers of France
Wrestlers at the 1924 Summer Olympics
French male sport wrestlers
Place of birth missing